Slim Jim may refer to:

Object or product
 Slim Jim (snack food), a brand of beef snack made by ConAgra Foods, Inc. 
 Slim Jim (antenna), a type of dipole radio antenna
 Slim jim (lock pick), a tool for bypassing car locks
 nickname for the narrow-body version of the British Rail Class 33 locomotive
 nickname of the GM Roto Hydramatic transmission
 a sandwich on the menu of Big Boy Restaurants
 a sandwich on the menu of Shoney's Restaurants
 a narrow necktie, favored in the Teddy Boy British subculture

Nickname or stage name
 Slim Jim Phantom, stage name of James McDonnell (born 1961), drummer for the rockabilly group the Stray Cats  
 Jim Baxter (1939–2001), Scottish footballer
 Howard Earl (1869–1916), American Major League Baseball player
 W. E. Foster, late 19th and early 20th century con man – see Shootout on Juneau Wharf
 James M. Gavin (1907–1990), US Army lieutenant general in World War II and US Ambassador to France
 Ernest Iverson (1903–1958), American radio personality

Entertainment
 Slim Jim, a character in the 1960 UK puppet television series Four Feather Falls
 "Slim Jim", a 1964 episode of the UK television series Dixon of Dock Green
 "Slim Jim", a track on the 1967 album A Bag Full of Blues by American jazz organist Jimmy McGriff

Slim Jim Sasquatch played by Jordan Saunders.

Other uses
 Slim Jim All Pro Series, former name of the NASCAR AutoZone Elite Division, Southeast Series.

Lists of people by nickname